The FIDE Women's Grand Prix 2015–16 was a series of five chess tournaments exclusively for women, which determined one player to play in the Women's World Chess Championship Match 2018, a 10-game match against the knockout world champion.

This was the fourth cycle of the tournament series. Top ranked player was Hou Yifan, who won the previous three editions of the Grand Prix, but had withdrawn participation after playing in the first tournament. The overall Grand Prix was won by Chinese player Ju Wenjun, who overtook Koneru Humpy at the last tournament. Koneru Humpy thereby finished overall runner-up for the fourth time.

Format
Originally the Grand Prix was scheduled as a 4-event tour. However, at the March 2016 FIDE Presidential Board meeting, a fifth event was then added, which replaced the Women's Knockout championship. Sixteen women were selected to compete in these tournaments, though with the expansion the total became twenty, along with extras to replace the withdrawn Hou Yifan. Each player agrees to a contract to participate in exactly three of these tournaments.  The players must rank their preference of tournaments once the final list of host cities is announced and the dates are allocated to each host city.

Each tournament is a 12-player, single round-robin tournament. In each round players score 1 point for a win, ½ point for a draw and 0 for a loss. Grand Prix points were then allocated according to each player's standing in the tournament: 160 grand prix points for first place, 130 for second place, 110 for third place, and then 90 down to 10 points by increments of 10. In case of a tie in points the Grand Prix points are shared evenly by the tied players.

Players only count their three best tournament results. The player with the most Grand Prix points is the winner. FIDE reserved the right to change locations and dates and increase the tournaments to six (6) and players to eighteen (18), each player in four (4) tournaments. Eventually they expanded the Grand Prix but not in the contractual manner specified, deciding to add a fifth stop at their Moscow presidential meeting (March 2016), with approximately 20 players in all taking part, keeping 3 tournaments per player.

Players and qualification
Players invited base on qualifying criteria were:
The four semi-finalists of the Women's World Chess Championship 2015:
 Mariya Muzychuk
 Natalia Pogonina
 Pia Cramling
 Dronavalli Harika
The six highest ranked players (averaged over a year):
 Hou Yifan
 Koneru Humpy
 Nana Dzagnidze
 Ju Wenjun
 Anna Muzychuk
 Valentina Gunina
Two FIDE presidential nominees
 Antoaneta Stefanova
 Alexandra Kosteniuk
Five organizer nominees:
 Almira Skripchenko
 Sarasadat Khademalsharieh
 Nino Batsiashvili
 Zhao Xue
 Olga Girya
Other players appearing in tournaments:
 Natalia Zhukova
 Lela Javakhishvili
 Bela Khotenashvili
Two players appearing only one tournament:
 Elina Danielian
 Tan Zhongyi

In May, 2016, Hou Yifan announced that she was dropping out of the Women's Grand Prix because she disagrees with the process of determining the Women's World Champion. FIDE has kept every second Women's World Championship as a 64-player knockout tournament since 2010, which Hou characterized as a "lottery." The winner of the knockout is the Women's World Champion, and then plays the overall winner of the Grand Prix. Hou believes that as the current World Champion she should defend her title against a challenger (as the Men's World Championship is decided), rather than playing in qualifying tournaments and then having to play against the winner of the knockout tournament. Alternatively, under the current setup, if she wins both the knockout tournament and the Grand Prix, she would have to play the woman who took second place in the Grand Prix for the title. In the 2013-2014 cycle, Hou was unable to play in the knockout tournament because she had already committed to play in another venue when the knockout tournament was scheduled; therefore, she lost her title to Mariya Muzychuk temporarily and regained it in a match in 2016 (delayed from 2015). Hou also said she will not be playing in the knockout tournament in this cycle.

Prize money and Grand Prix points
The prize money for the single tournaments and the overall series stayed the same as the previous year, that is €60,000 per single Grand Prix and €90,000 for the overall Grand Prix finish.

Tiebreaks
With the objective of determining a clear, single winner to play in the Challenger Match and in the case of the top two or more players having equal cumulative points, the following criteria (in descending order) will be utilized to decide the overall winner:
 Number of actual game result points scored in the three tournaments.
 Number of first places (in case of a tie – points given accordingly).
 Number of second places (in case of a tie – points given accordingly).
 Number of wins.
 Drawing of lots.

Schedule
Like the men's Grand Prix, the number of tournaments were reduced, here from six to five.

Events crosstables

Monaco 2015
{| class="wikitable" style="text-align:center;"
|+ 1st stage, Monte Carlo, Monaco, 2–16 October 2015
! !! Player !! Rating !! 1 !! 2 !! 3 !! 4 !! 5 !! 6 !! 7 !! 8 !! 9 !! 10 !! 11 !! 12 !!  Total !! Rating Change !! H2H !! Victories !! SB !! TPR !! GP
|-
| 1 || align=left |  || 2671
| * || 1 || 0 || 1 || 1 || ½ || 1 || 1 || ½ || 1 || 1 || 1 || 9 || +11 || 0 || 8 || 45.00 || 2766 || 160
|-
| 2 || align=left |  || 2528
| 0 || * || 1 || ½ || ½ || ½ || 1 || 1 || ½ || 1 || ½ || ½ || 7|| +13 || 1 || 4 || 36.00 || 2619 || 120
|-
| 3 || align=left |  || 2578
| 1 || 0 || * || ½ || ½ || 1 || 0 || 1 || 0 || 1 || 1 || 1 || 7 || +5 || 0 || 6 || 36.00 || 2614 || 120
|-
| 4 || align=left |  || 2513
| 0 || ½ || ½ || * || ½ || ½ || 1 || ½ || ½ || 0 || 1 || 1 || 6 || +17 || ½ || 3 || 29.00 || 2554 || 85
|-
| 5 || align=left |  || 2445
| 0 || ½ || ½ || ½ || * || ½ || 0 || 1 || 1 || ½ || ½ || 1 || 6 || 6 || ½ || 3 || 28.25 || 2560 || 85
|-
| 6 || align=left |  || 2525
| ½ || ½ || 0 || ½ || ½ || * || 0 || 1 || ½ || ½ || ½ || 1 || 5½ || -1 || 1 || 4 || 26.75 || 2517 || 65
|-
| 7 || align=left |  || 2500
| 0 || 0 || 1 || 0 || 1 || 1 || * || 0 || ½ || ½ || ½ || 1 || 5½ || +3 || 0 || 2 || 27.25 || 2519 || 65
|-
| 8 || align=left |  || 2573 
| 0 || 0 || 0 || ½ || 0 || 0 || 1 || * || 1 || ½ || ½ || 1 || 5|| -14 || 0 || 4 || 21.25 || 2476 || 50
|-
| 9 || align=left |  || 2441
| 0 || ½ || 0 || 0 || ½ || ½ || ½ || 0 || * || 1 || ½ || 1 || 4½ || +3 || 1½ || 2 || 20.25 || 2459 || 30
|-
| 10 || align=left |  || 2485
| 0 || 0 || 0 || 1 || ½ || ½ || ½ || ½ || ½ || * || ½ || ½ || 4½ || -5 || 1 || 1 || 22.25 || 2455 || 30
|-
| 11 || align=left |  || 2549
| ½ || ½ || 1 || ½ || 0 || ½ || ½ || 0 || 0 || ½ || * || ½ || 4½|| -15 || ½ || 1 || 26.50 || 2450 || 30
|-
| 12 || align=left |  || 2402 
| 0 || ½ || 0 || 0 || 0 || 0 || 0 || 0 || ½ || ½ || 0 || * || 1½ || -22 || 0 || 0 || 8.00 || 2219 || 10
|}

Tehran 2016
{| class="wikitable" style="text-align:center;"
|+ 2nd stage, Tehran, Iran, 10–24 February 2016
! !! Player !! Rating !! 1 !! 2 !! 3 !! 4 !! 5 !! 6 !! 7 !! 8 !! 9 !! 10 !! 11 !! 12 !! Total !! Rating Change !! H2H !! Victories !! SB !! TPR !! GP
|-
| 1 || align=left |  || 2558
| * || ½ || ½ || ½ || 1 || 1 || ½ || ½ || ½ || 1 || 1 || ½ || 7½ || +11 || 0 || 4 || 39.25 || 2631|| 160
|-
| 2 || align=left |  || 2403 
| ½ || * || 1 || ½ || ½ || ½ || 0 || 1 || ½ || ½ || 1 || 1 || 7 || +31 || 1 || 4 || 36.00 || 2614 || 120 
|-
| 3 || align=left |  || 2506
| ½ || 0 || * || 1 || ½ || 0 || 1 || ½ || 1 || 1 || ½ || 1 || 7 || +15 || 0 || 5 || 35.00 || 2605 || 120
|-
| 4 || align=left |  || 2454
| ½ || ½ || 0 || * || 1 || 1 || 0 || ½ || 1 || 1 || 0 || 1 || 6½ || +18 || 1 || 5 || 34.00 || 2573 || 85 
|-
| 5 || align=left |  || 2529
| 0 || ½ || ½ || 0 || * || ½ || 1 || 1 || 1 || 0 || 1 || 1 || 6½ || +6 || 0 || 5 || 31.50 || 2566 || 85 
|-
| 6 || align=left |  || 2583 
| 0 || ½ || 1 || 0 || ½ || * || ½ || 1 || ½ || ½ || 1 || ½ || 6 || -8 || 0 || 3 || 30.50 || 2532 || 70
|-
| 7 || align=left |  || 2484
| ½ || 1 || 0 || 1 || 0 || ½ || * || ½ || 1 || 0 || ½ || ½ || 5½ || +3 || 0 || 3 || 30.50 || 2505 || 60
|-
| 8 || align=left |  || 2496
| ½ || 0 || ½ || ½ || 0 || 0 || 0 || * || ½ || 1 || ½ || 1 || 4½ || -9 || ½ || 2 || 22.00 || 2504|| 45
|-
| 9 || align=left |  || 2511 
| ½ || ½ || 0 || 0 || 0 || ½ || ½ || ½ || * || ½ || 1 || ½ || 4½ || -11 || ½ || 1 || 22.50 || 2438 || 45
|-
| 10 || align=left |  || 2529
| 0 || ½ || 0 || 0 || 1 || ½ || 1 || 0 || ½ || * || ½ || 0 || 4 || -18 || 0 || 2 || 22.50 || 2400 || 30
|-
| 11 || align=left |  || 2509
| 0 || 0 || ½ || 1 || 0 || 0 || ½ || ½ || 0 || ½ || * || ½ || 3½ || -21 || ½ || 1 || 18.75 || 2370 || 15
|-
| 12 || align=left |  || 2485
| ½ || 0 || 0 || 0 || 0 || ½ || ½ || 0 || ½ || 1 || ½ || * || 3½ || -17 || ½ || 1 || 17.50 || 2372 || 15
|}
Sarasadat Khademalsharieh achieved a 9-game GM norm, her first one.

Batumi 2016
{| class="wikitable" style="text-align:center;"
|+ 3rd stage, Batumi, Georgia, 19 April – 3 May 2016
! !! Player !! Rating !! 1 !! 2 !! 3 !! 4 !! 5 !! 6 !! 7 !! 8 !! 9 !! 10 !! 11 !! 12 !! Total !! Rating Change !! H2H !! Victories !! SB !! TPR !! GP
|-
| 1 || align=left |  || 2497
| * || 1 || ½ || 1 || 1 || 0 || ½ || 1 || 1 || 0 || 1 || ½ || 7½ || +21 || 0 || 6 || 40.25 || 2634 || 160
|-
| 2 || align=left |  || 2557
| 0 || * || ½ || ½ || 1 || 1 || ½ || ½ || 0 || 1 || 1 || ½ || 6½ || +1 || 0 || 4 || 33.75 || 2560 || 130 
|-
| 3 || align=left |  || 2476
| ½ || ½ || * || 1 || ½ || 0 || ½ || ½ || 1 || 1 || 0 || ½ || 6 || +9 || 1 || 3 || 33.00 || 2539 || 100
|-
| 4 || align=left |  || 2555
| 0 || ½ || 0 || * || 1 || ½ || 1 || ½ || 1 || ½ || ½ || ½ || 6 || -4 || 0 || 3 || 31.25 || 2532 || 100 
|-
| 5 || align=left |  || 2504
| 0 || 0 || ½ || 0 || * || 1 || 1 || ½ || 1 || 0 || ½ || 1 || 5½ || -1 || 2 || 4 || 27.75 || 2500 || 70 
|-
| 6 || align=left |  || 2535 
| 1 || 0 || 1 || ½ || 0 || * || ½ || 0 || ½ || 1 || ½ || ½ || 5½ || -6 || ½ || 3 || 31.00 || 2497 || 70
|-
| 7 || align=left |  || 2453
| ½ || ½ || ½ || 0 || 0 || ½ || * || 1 || ½ || ½ || ½ || 1 || 5½ || +8 || ½ || 2 || 29.00 || 2505 || 70
|-
| 8 || align=left |  || 2561
| 0 || ½ || ½ || ½ || ½ || 1 || 0 || * || ½ || 1 || 0 || ½ || 5 || -15 || 1½ || 2 || 27.00 || 2459 || 40
|-
| 9 || align=left |  || 2489 
| 0 || 1 || 0 || 0 || 0 || ½ || ½ || ½ || * || ½ || 1 || 1 || 5 || -3 || 1 || 3 || 25.50 || 2466 || 40
|-
| 10 || align=left |  || 2442
| 1 || 0 || 0 || ½ || 1 || 0 || ½ || 0 || ½ || * || 1 || ½ || 5 || +5 || ½ || 3 || 27.75 || 2470 || 40
|-
| 11 || align=left |  || 2445
| 0 || 0 || 1 || ½ || ½ || ½ || ½ || 1 || 0 || 0 || * || ½ || 4½ || -1 || 0 || 2 || 24.25 || 2441 || 20
|-
| 12 || align=left |  || 2493
| ½ || ½ || ½ || ½ || 0 || ½ || 0 || ½ || 0 || ½ || ½ || * || 4 || -14 || 0 || 0 || 23.00 || 2399 || 10
|}

Chengdu 2016
{| class="wikitable" style="text-align:center;"
|+ 4th stage, Chengdu, China, 1–15 July 2016
! !! Player !! Rating !! 1 !! 2 !! 3 !! 4 !! 5 !! 6 !! 7 !! 8 !! 9 !! 10 !! 11 !! 12 !! Total !! Rating Change !! H2H !! Victories !! SB !! TPR !! GP
|-
| 1 || align=left |  || 2526
| * || 1 || ½ || ½ || ½ || ½ || ½ || ½ || 1 || ½ || 1 || ½ || 7 || +13 || 1 || 3 || 37.50 || 2612 || 145
|-
| 2 || align=left |  || 2575
| 0 || * || ½ || 1 || 0 || ½ || 1 || 1 || ½ || 1 || 1 || ½ || 7 || +5 || 0 || 5 || 36.00 || 2607 || 145 
|-
| 3 || align=left |  || 2578
| ½ || ½ || * || ½ || 1 || ½ || 0 || ½ || ½ || ½ || ½ || 1 || 6 || -6 || 1½ || 2 || 32.00 || 2541 || 93⅓
|-
| 4 || align=left |  || 2512
| ½ || 0 || ½ || * || ½ || ½ || 1 || ½ || 1 || ½ || ½ || ½ || 6 || +5 || 1 || 2 || 31.75 || 2547 || 93⅓
|-
| 5 || align=left |  || 2545
| ½ || 1 || 0 || ½ || * || 1 || ½ || ½ || ½ || ½ || ½ || ½ || 6 || -1 || ½ || 2 || 33.25 || 2544 || 93⅓
|-
| 6 || align=left |  || 2454
| ½ || ½ || ½ || ½ || 0 || * || ½ || 1 || ½ || 0 || ½ || 1 || 5½ || +9 || 1½ || 2 || 29.25 || 2516 || 60
|-
| 7 || align=left |  || 2510
| ½ || 0 || 1 || 0 || ½ || ½ || * || ½ || ½ || ½ || ½ || 1 || 5½ || +0 || 1 || 2 || 28.50 || 2511 || 60
|-
| 8 || align=left |  || 2545
| ½ || 0 || ½ || ½ || ½ || 0 || ½ || * || ½ || ½ || 1 || 1 || 5½  || -6 || ½ || 2 || 27.75 || 2508 || 60
|-
| 9 || align=left |  || 2487
| 0 || ½ || ½ || 0 || ½ || ½ || ½ || ½ || * || 1 || ½ || ½ || 5 || -1 || 1 || 1 || 26.50 || 2477 || 35
|-
| 10 || align=left |  || 2444
| ½ || 0 || ½ || ½ || ½ || 1 || ½ || ½ || 0 || * || ½ || ½ || 5 || +6 || 0 || 1 || 27.25 || 2481 || 35
|-
| 11 || align=left |  || 2495
| 0 || 0 || ½ || ½ || ½ || ½ || ½ || 0 || ½ || ½ || * || ½ || 4 || -12 || 0 || 0 || 21.25 || 2411 || 20
|-
| 12 || align=left |  || 2463
| ½ || ½ || 0 || ½ || ½ || 0 || 0 || 0 || ½ || ½ || ½ || * || 3½ || -12 || 0 || 0 || 20.00 || 2383 || 10
|}

Khanty-Mansiysk 2016
{| class="wikitable" style="text-align:center;"
|+ 5th stage, Khanty-Mansiysk, Russia, 18 November – 2 December 2016
! !! Player !! Rating !! 1 !! 2 !! 3 !! 4 !! 5 !! 6 !! 7 !! 8 !! 9 !! 10 !! 11 !! 12 !! Total !! Rating Change !! H2H !! Victories !! SB !! TPR !! GP
|-
| 1 || align=left |  || 2580
| * || 1 || 1 || 1 || ½ || ½ || 0 || ½ || ½ || ½ || 1 || + || 7½ || +2 || 0 || 4 ||  || || 160
|-
| 2 || align=left |  || 2489
| 0 || * || 0 || ½ || 1 || ½ || 1 || 1 || 1 || ½ || 0 || 1 || 6½ || +10 || 0 || 5 ||  ||  || 130 
|-
| 3 || align=left |  || 2525
| 0 || 1 || * || 0 || ½ || 1 || 1 || 0 || 0 || ½ || 1 || 1 || 6 || -2 || 2½ || 5 ||  ||  || 82
|-
| 4 || align=left |  || 2435
| 0 || ½ || 1 || * || ½ || ½ || ½ || ½ || ½ || 1 || ½ || ½ || 6 || +14 || 2½ || 2 ||  ||  || 82
|-
| 5 || align=left |  || 2543
| ½ || 0 || ½ || ½ || * || ½ || ½ || 1 || ½ || ½ || ½ || 1 || 6 || -4 || 2 || 2 ||  ||  || 82
|-
| 6 || align=left |  || 2450
| ½ || ½ || 0 || ½ || ½ || * || ½ || ½ || 0 || 1 || 1 || 1 || 6 || +11 || 1½ || 3 ||  ||  || 82
|-
| 7 || align=left |  || 2555
| 1 || 0 || 0 || ½ || ½ || ½ || * || ½ || ½ || 1 || 1 || ½ || 6 || -6 || 1½ || 3 ||  ||  || 82
|-
| 8 || align=left |  || 2448
| ½ || 0 || 1 || ½ || 0 || ½ || ½ || * || ½ || ½ || ½ || 1 || 5½  || +7 || 0 || 2 ||  ||  || 50
|-
| 9 || align=left |  || 2426
| ½ || 0 || 1 || ½ || ½ || 1 || 0 || ½ || * || 0 || ½ || ½ || 5 || +5 || 0 || 2 ||  ||  || 40
|-
| 10 || align=left |  || 2492
| ½ || ½ || ½ || 0 || ½ || 0 || 0 || ½ || ½ || * || ½ || ½ || 4½ || -10 || ½ || 0 ||  ||  || 25
|-
| 11 || align=left |  || 2461
| 0 || 1 || 0 || ½ || ½ || 0 || ½ || ½ || ½ || ½ || * || ½ || 4½ || -6 || ½ || 1 ||  ||  || 25
|-
| 12 || align=left |  || 2455
| - || 0 || 0 || ½ || 0 || 0 || ½ || 0 || ½ || ½ || ½ || * || 2½ || -21 || 0 || 0 ||  ||  || 10
|}

Grand Prix standings
At the third tournament it was mentioned top ranked Hou Yifan had withdrawn from the Grand-Prix. Koneru Humpy was leading the table after four tournaments. After winning in the tenth round of the last tournament, Ju Wenjun secured the overall Grand Prix win.

See also
 FIDE Women's Grand Prix 2013–14, the previous cycle

References

External links
Official websites: Monaco, Tehran, Batumi, Chengdu, Khanty-Mansiysk
FIDE Women's Grand Prix Regulations

Women's chess competitions
2015 in chess
2016 in chess
FIDE Grand Prix